Saint Joseph's Academy, sometimes referred to as St. Joe or SJA, was a private school started by the Marist Brothers of the Schools. It was located in Laredo, Texas, United States, and served junior high and high school students in Laredo and the surrounding areas.

History
St. Joseph's Academy was founded in Laredo in 1934 by exiled Marist Brothers who were fleeing Mexico to avoid religious persecution by the Mexican government. In 1942, St. Joseph's Academy had its first graduating class. The school had its last graduating class in 1973. The school colors were maroon and white. The school mascot was the ram but because the word "rams" could be used in a derogatory way in Spanish, the mascot was changed to "antlers".

Alumni
Charles Robert Borchers (Class of 1960), district attorney of the 49th Judicial District attorney 1973-1980
Julio A. Garcia (Class of 1959), district attorney of the 49th Judicial District 1981-1988
Pete Saenz (Class of 1969), mayor of Laredo since November 12, 2014; former member and president of the Laredo Community College board of trustees.

References

External links
 http://laredo.craigslist.org/bks/4527240518.html - 1953 Yearbook

Educational institutions established in 1934
1934 establishments in Texas